Otto Wahl (9 July 1904 – 1 July 1935) was a German cross-country skier. He competed in the men's 18 kilometre event at the 1928 Winter Olympics.

References

External links
 

1904 births
1935 deaths
German male cross-country skiers
Olympic cross-country skiers of Germany
Cross-country skiers at the 1928 Winter Olympics
People from Zella-Mehlis
Sportspeople from Thuringia